Janvier Kanyamashuli was the ambassador of Rwanda to Burundi as of late 2007. He also served as Executive Secretary of the National Tender Board.

References

Ambassadors of Rwanda to Burundi
Rwandan diplomats
Year of birth missing (living people)
Living people